Guangxin District formerly, Shangrao County, is a district in the northeast of Jiangxi province, People's Republic of China, bordering Fujian province to the south. It is under the jurisdiction of the prefecture-level city of Shangrao.

Administrative divisions
In the present, Guangxin District has 3 subdistricts, 11 towns and 10 townships.
3 subdistricts
 Xuri
 Luoqiao
 Xingyuan

11 towns

10 townships

Demographics 

Climate

Notes and references

External links 
  Government site - 

Shangrao
County-level divisions of Jiangxi